Derbyshire Fire and Rescue Service is the statutory fire and rescue service for the county of Derbyshire, England.

History
The Fire Services Act 1947 created two brigades for Derbyshire  the County Borough of Derby Fire Brigade and the Derbyshire Fire Service. In 1974, local government reorganisation led to the creation of a single organisation for the county  Derbyshire Fire Service. The word 'rescue' was added to the title in the early 1990s to reflect the changing responsibilities of the service.

Performance
In 2018/2019, every fire and rescue service in England and Wales was subjected to a statutory inspection by Her Majesty's Inspectorate of Constabulary and Fire & Rescue Services (HIMCFRS). The inspection investigated how well the service performs in each of three areas. On a scale of outstanding, good, requires improvement and inadequate, Derbyshire Fire and Rescue Service was rated as follows:

Fire stations
There are 31 fire stations currently in operation with the service. New fire stations are to be built in Glossop, Matlock and New Mills, by the financial year 20242025 at a cost of £9million, replacing stations aged around 50 years that are no longer fit for purpose.

Notable incidents

Derbyshire Fire and Rescue service were heavily involved in the coordination and response to the near-dam collapse incident at Toddbrook Reservoir, Whaley Bridge in Derbyshire. The service operated its strategic response out of a holding area based at Buxton fire station and its operational response from a forward command post at a sports field at the side of the reservoir. On 1 August 2019, a major incident was declared and 1,500 residents were evacuated from parts of Whaley Bridge, Furness Vale and New Mills after concrete slabs on the 1969 overflow spillway were partially dislodged by high volumes of water following several days of heavy rain. The Environment Agency issued a 'danger to life' warning due to the possibility of the dam collapsing. High-volume pumps were deployed to take water from the reservoir to prevent it from overflowing and reduce pressure on the dam. An RAF Chinook helicopter dropped 400tonnes of aggregate into the damaged area and specialist contractors added concrete grouting between the bags of ballast to bind them together to support the spillway.

See also
 Fire service in the United Kingdom
 Fire apparatus
 Firefighter
 Fire engine
 List of British firefighters killed in the line of duty

Notes 
Derbyshire Fire & Rescue Service (2010). "The History of Derbyshire Fire & Rescue Service", Internal Publication.

References

External links

Derbyshire Fire and Rescue Service at HMICFRS

Fire and rescue services of England
Organisations based in Derby